Long Time Noisy, the third album from the Filipino rock band, Kamikazee. It has 20 tracks and released under Universal Records in 2009.

Track listing

Personnel 
Jay Contreras (vocals)
Jomal Linao (guitars/backing vocals)
Led Tuyay (guitars/backing vocals)
Puto Astete (bass)
Bords Burdeos (drums)

References

2009 albums
Kamikazee albums